Gymnastics was contested at the 2015 Summer Universiade from July 4 to 13 at the Gwangju Women's University Universiade Gymnasium in Gwangju, South Korea. Artistic and rhythmic gymnastics were the two disciplines of gymnastics contested.

Medal summary

Medal table

Artistic gymnastics
The artistic gymnastics competition contested from July 4 to July 7.

Men's events

Women's events

Rhythmic gymnastics
The rhythmic gymnastics competition contested from July 11 to July 13.

Individual

Group

References

External links
2015 Summer Universiade – Artistic gymnastics
2015 Summer Universiade – Rhythmic gymnastics

 
2015 in gymnastics
Gymnastics at the Summer Universiade
2015 Summer Universiade events